Aethalopteryx pindarus is a moth in the family Cossidae. It is found in Kenya, Uganda and South Africa.

References

Moths described in 1916
Aethalopteryx
Moths of Africa